Julia Lloyd may refer to:

 Julia Lloyd (cricketer), English cricketer
 Julia Lloyd (kindergarten) (1867–1955), British philanthropist and educationalist